María Denisse Dibós Silva (born 15 April 1967, Lima, Perú) is a Peruvian actress, theatrical producer, music director, art educator, dance instructor, singer, and businessperson. She is creator and director of "Preludio Asociación Cultural", with which she has produced several musicals and plays since 1997. This musicals are adaptations of Broadway originals productions with respective rights and permissions.

Denise trained as a concert pianist (master in classical music) in California, USA for 8 years.

Dibós also worked as a teacher of the Faculty of Communication Arts and the Pontificia Universidad Católica del Perú and in Teatro de la Universidad Católica (TUC).

The musical The Boy from Oz was released in May 2013, starring Marco Zunino as Allen and produced by "Preludio A.C.". It was the first Spanish language adaptation of this musical.

Personal life 
In March 2011, she gave birth to her first daughter named Paloma, from her relationship with economist Gabriel Ortiz de Zevallos.

Theatre works

Filmography

References 
In Spanish

External links 
Official site web "Preludio"

Living people
1967 births
Singers from Lima
Peruvian musical theatre actresses
Music directors
Peruvian television actresses
Art educators
Dance teachers
Peruvian female models
Peruvian film actresses
Peruvian women in business
20th-century Peruvian women singers
20th-century Peruvian singers
20th-century Peruvian actresses
21st-century Peruvian actresses